Erin is a city in and the county seat of Houston County, Tennessee. The population was 1,224 at the time of the 2020 census and 1,324 at the time of the 2010 census.

History
The city was perhaps named for Erin, a poetic name for Ireland. 

Each year in March,beginning in 1962 (61 years ago as of 2023) the town has held a weeklong Irish festival, one of the top ten celebrations in the U.S., with a parade, banquets, pageants, arts and crafts, and other events celebrating Erin's Irish heritage and honoring the sacrifice of Irish railroad workers who helped link Erin to the rest of the world.

Geography
Erin is located at  (36.316998, -87.697946). The elevation is 480 feet above sea level.

Major roads and highways
 State Route 13
 State Route 49 (Main Street)
 State Route 149

ZIP code
The ZIP code used in the Erin area is 37061.

Area code
Erin uses the area code 931.

Government
 Board of Aldermen & Mayor meets first Tuesday of the month at 6:00 p.m. at Erin City Hall.
 Planning Commission meets on the fourth Monday of the month at 6:00 p.m. at Erin City Hall.

Elected officials
 City Mayor: Paul Bailey
 City Recorder: Angela Neilson
 City Bookkeeper: Cheryl Hollis
 City Clerks: Betty Beard and Farrah Dennis

Aldermen
 Ward 1: Lou Anne Pollard and Wanda Lockhart
 Ward 2: Betsy Ligon (Vice Mayor) and Cecil Baggett
 Ward 3: Linda Owens and Nethla Shires
 Ward 4: Loraine Beechum and Paul J. Gooden

Demographics

2020 census

As of the 2020 United States census, there were 1,224 people, 514 households, and 251 families residing in the city.

2000 census
As of the census of 2000, there were 1,490 people, 588 households, and 355 families residing in the city. The population density was 363.6 people per square mile (140.3/km2). There were 653 housing units at an average density of 159.4 per square mile (61.5/km2). The racial makeup of the city was 86.38% White, 10.40% African American, 0.27% Native American, 0.67% from other races, and 2.28% from two or more races. Hispanic or Latino of any race were 0.94% of the population.

There were 588 households, out of which 28.4% had children under the age of 18 living with them, 40.1% were married couples living together, 16.3% had a female householder with no husband present, and 39.5% were non-families. 37.2% of all households were made up of individuals, and 21.9% had someone living alone who was 65 years of age or older. The average household size was 2.23 and the average family size was 2.92.

In the city the population was spread out, with 22.3% under the age of 18, 7.6% from 18 to 24, 22.4% from 25 to 44, 22.3% from 45 to 64, and 25.4% who were 65 years of age or older. The median age was 43 years. For every 100 females, there were 81.7 males. For every 100 females age 18 and over, there were 74.5 males.

The median income for a household in the city was $23,107, and the median income for a family was $30,833. Males had a median income of $26,484 versus $18,333 for females. The per capita income for the city was $15,281. About 19.2% of families and 23.7% of the population were below the poverty line, including 30.4% of those under age 18 and 25.1% of those age 65 or over.

Schools

Public high schools
 Houston County Adult High School (Students: 2; Location: 3573 West Main Street; Grades: 11–12)
 Houston County High School (Location: Hwy 149 Street; Grades: 09 - 12)

Public primary/middle schools
 Erin Elementary School (Students: 456; Location: 6500 State Route 13; Grades: K–5)
 Houston County Middle School (Students: 338; Location: 1241 West Main Street; Grades: 6–8)

References

External links
 Official site
 City charter

Cities in Tennessee
Cities in Houston County, Tennessee
County seats in Tennessee